Renal glycosuria is a rare condition in which the simple sugar glucose is excreted in the urine despite normal or low blood glucose levels.  With normal kidney (renal) function, glucose is excreted in the urine only when there are abnormally elevated levels of glucose in the blood.  However, in those with renal glycosuria, glucose is abnormally elevated in the urine due to improper functioning of the renal tubules, which are primary components of nephrons, the filtering units of the kidneys.

Signs and symptoms
In most affected individuals, the condition causes no apparent symptoms (asymptomatic) or serious effects.  When renal glycosuria occurs as an isolated finding with otherwise normal kidney function, the condition is thought to be inherited as an autosomal recessive trait.

Genetics
It is associated with SLC5A2, coding the sodium-glucose cotransporter 2.

Diagnosis
A doctor normally can diagnose renal glycosuria when a routine urine test (Urinalysis) detects glucose in the urine, while a blood test indicates that the blood glucose level is normal.

Treatment
The cause of glycosuria determines whether the condition is chronic or acute. However, the presence of glucose in urine is not necessarily a serious or life-threatening condition.Managing diabetes, hyperthyroidism and regular kidney function tests can help in reducing excretion of sugars in urine.

Drugs like dapagliflozin and canagliflozin have recently been approved for lowering blood sugar levels in patients with type 2 diabetes mellitus.

See also
 Sodium-glucose transport proteins

References

External links 

 

Membrane transport protein disorders